Lille Grønnegade Theatre was a Danish theatre which was active from 1722 to 1728. It was the first public theatre in Copenhagen in Denmark.

History 
 
In 1721, the French troupe La troupe du Roi de Danemark, which had performed for the royal court in Copenhagen since 1682, was fired by the king, who wished to hire an Italian opera troupe instead. As the French actors, who in many cases had lived in Denmark for generations, did not all wish to leave, René Magnon and another French immigrant, Etienne Capion, asked for permission to open a public theatre. They were granted royal permission and in 1722, and the first public theatre was opened in Copenhagen on Lille Grønnegade, the first Danish-language theatre open to the public.

Capion was the director, Magnon was responsible for the actors, and Marie Madeleine de Montaigu became the first actress to have performed for the Danish public at an official theatre. The female actors were few: among them were also Helene le Coffre, Maren Magdalene Lerche and Marie Madeleine's own daughter Frederikke Sophie. Plays were performed in Danish but there was also dance: in 1726, Jean-Baptiste Landé was a guest ballet master.

The economic troubles, however, proved to be too difficult. In 1728, the theatre was closed, and in 1730, theatre was banned in Denmark until 1746.

References 
 Dansk kvindebiografisk leksikon
 Gidlunds förlag: "Ny svensk teaterhistoria. Teater före 1800" (New Swedish theatre history. Theatre before 1800) (In Swedish)

Former theatres in Copenhagen
History of theatre
1722 establishments in Denmark
1728 disestablishments
18th century in Copenhagen